David Julián Levecq Vives (born 15 August 1984 in Béziers, France) is a swimmer from Spain.

Personal 
Levecq was born 15 August 1984 in Béziers, France. He has a mild physical disability. In 2012, he lived in Sant Cugat del Vallès, Barcelona.

Swimming 
Levecq is an S10 classification swimmer. He is affiliated with the Spanish Federation of Sports for the Physically Disabled (FEDDF).

Levecq competed at the 2004 Summer Paralympics, earning a silver in the 50 meter freestyle and the 100 meter freestyle. In 2007, he competed at the IDM German Open.  He raced at the 2008 Summer Paralympics, and earned a silver medal in the 100 meter butterfly. In 2010, he competed at the Tenerife International Open.  He competed at the 2010 Adapted Swimming World Championship in the Netherlands. Twice during the competition, he set new European records in the 50 meter freestyle event. In advance of the competition,  he attended a swimming camp with the national team that was part of the Paralympic High Performance Program (HARP Program).  He competed at the 2011 IPC European Swimming Championships in Berlin, Germany, where he earned a gold medal in the 100 meter freestyle. He raced at the 2012 Summer Paralympics. He competed at the 2013 Swimming Championship of Catalonia, hosted by the Sabadell Swimming Club, where he was one of nine Spanish swimmers to set a qualifying time for the World Championships. From the Catalan region of Spain, he was a recipient of a 2012 Plan ADO scholarship. He competed at the 2013 IPC Swimming World Championships.

References

External links 
 
 

1981 births
Living people
Sportspeople from Béziers
Paralympic swimmers of Spain
Paralympic silver medalists for Spain
Paralympic medalists in swimming
Swimmers at the 2008 Summer Paralympics
Swimmers at the 2004 Summer Paralympics
Swimmers at the 2012 Summer Paralympics
Medalists at the 2004 Summer Paralympics
Medalists at the 2008 Summer Paralympics
Plan ADOP alumni
Mediterranean Games gold medalists for Spain
Mediterranean Games silver medalists for Spain
Mediterranean Games medalists in swimming
Swimmers at the 2013 Mediterranean Games
Swimmers at the 2018 Mediterranean Games
Medalists at the World Para Swimming Championships
Medalists at the World Para Swimming European Championships
French people of Spanish descent
Swimmers at the 2020 Summer Paralympics
Spanish male freestyle swimmers
Spanish male butterfly swimmers